Rasipuram railway station (station code: RASP) is a railway station situated in Rasipuram, in the Indian state of Tamil Nadu. The station is an intermediate station on the newly commissioned – line which became operational in  May 2013. The station is operated by the Southern Railway zone of the Indian Railways and comes under the Salem railway division.

Transport
From the railway station, only auto rickshaws are available. Local public transport facility not available from railway station.

Transport connectivity from the New Bustand :Kolli Hills, Kallakuruchi, Caddalore, Trichy, Chennai (towards Namagiripet and Mettala Junction) Tiruchengode, Erode, Coimbatore (towards Andagalore Gate), Salem, Mettur, Dharmapuri (towards Old Bustand, ATC Depot)

Adjacent towns
Block's & Revenue Towns @Rasipuram East: Namagiripet, Mettala, Belukuruchi, Kakkaveri, R.Pudupatti, Mullukuruchi, Mangalapuram

References

Salem railway division
Railway stations in Namakkal district